Pallet crafts are crafts and projects which use discarded wooden shipping pallets.

Wooden pallets are often used for shipping products, but when these get old, they are often thrown away. However, there are many ways to recycle old pallets.

Issue 14 of ReadyMade Magazine issued out a MacGyver challenge to find some way to reuse shipping pallets. In the following two issues of the magazine, plans and pictures for winning submissions were shown. Winning submissions included:
 A bench
 A picnic set
 A chair and table set
 A lounge chair
 A raised garden bed

One can also find plans online for other craft projects using pallets, such as plans for:
 Compost bins
 Birdhouses
 Sheds
 Planters

Also, one can read about how people have made various things out of pallets, such as:
 A coffee table
 Guitars, including famous American quality guitar maker, Taylor Guitars
 Beds, Sofas, Swings and Garden furniture 
 Bunkers for woodsball, a variant of the sport of paintball
 An ignitable pirate raft, filled to the brim with fireworks and flying the Jolly Roger 
 From headboards to console tables,

References

100 Ideas For Wooden Pallets Furniture

Crafts